The Western Football League is a football league in South West England, covering Bristol, Cornwall, Devon, Somerset, western Dorset, parts of Gloucestershire and Wiltshire. The league's current main sponsor is Toolstation, so it is also known as the Toolstation League for sponsorship reasons.

Recent restructuring of the English football league system has placed the two divisions, known as the Premier Division and Division One (each a maximum of twenty-two clubs) at the ninth and tenth tiers overall, known as Step 5 and Step 6 of the National League System.

The champion club may apply for promotion to a Step 4 league, which in practice will almost certainly be the Southern League Division One South and West. Below the Western League are four local leagues covering smaller areas, the  Gloucestershire County League, the Somerset County League, the Dorset Premier League and the Wiltshire League. The South West Peninsula League Premier Divisions East and West are also feeders to the Western League but due to having Step 6 status (the same level as the Western League Division One), they feed directly into the Western League Premier Division.

List of 2021–22 member clubs

Premier Division

Division One

History
The league was formed in 1892 as the Bristol & District League, and became the Western League in 1895.  Another Bristol & District League was later formed, which remains active at a much lower level than the Western League. In the years before World War II, many teams played in both the Southern and Western Leagues; the Western League was considered as secondary to the Southern League.

On four occasions, member clubs have lifted the FA Vase, Tiverton Town twice, Taunton Town once and most recently Truro City, who beat A.F.C. Totton in 2007 at the first final to be held at the new Wembley Stadium before a competition record crowd of 27,754.  Truro City were the only one of the three to win the FA Vase while in Division One, while none are current members of the Western League, as all three have since progressed to the Southern League.

Founder members
 Bedminster (later merged with Bristol South End to form Bristol City) 
 Clevedon (later Clevedon Town) 
 Clifton Association 
 Eastville Rovers (later Bristol Rovers)
 Mangotsfield 
 St. George (later merged with Roman Glass F.C. to form Roman Glass St George) 
 Trowbridge Town 
 Warmley 
 Wells

List of champions

Bristol & District League

Western Football League

Teams promoted to Southern League (since 1946)

References

External links
 Official Site
 Western League – Fixtures, Results and Tables

 
1892 establishments in England
9
Football leagues in Wales
Sports leagues established in 1892